Amine Adli (born 10 May 2000) is a French professional footballer who plays as a winger for Bundesliga club Bayer Leverkusen.

Club career
On 30 October 2018, Adli signed his first professional contract with Toulouse. He made his professional debut with the club in a 4–1 Coupe de la Ligue loss to Lyon on 18 December 2019.

On 26 August 2021, Adli transferred to German club Bayer Leverkusen signing a five-year contract. He scored his first goal for the club on 30 September 2021 in a UEFA Europa League group stage match against Celtic; a 90th minute goal to round off a 4–0 away win. On 20 November 2021, he scored his first Bundesliga goal, scoring the only goal after 3 minutes in a 1–0 win over VfL Bochum.

International career
Born in France, Adli is of Moroccan descent. He is a youth international for France.

References

External links
 
 
 
 

2000 births
Living people
People from Eu, Seine-Maritime
French footballers
France youth international footballers
French sportspeople of Moroccan descent
Association football wingers
ES Paulhan-Pézenas players
AS Béziers (2007) players
Toulouse FC players
Bayer 04 Leverkusen players
Championnat National 3 players
Ligue 1 players
Ligue 2 players
Bundesliga players
French expatriate footballers
Expatriate footballers in Germany
French expatriate sportspeople in Germany
Sportspeople from Seine-Maritime
Footballers from Normandy